La Candelaria may refer to:

 La Candelaria, Catamarca, a village and rural municipality in Catamarca Province, Argentina
 La Candelaria, Salta, a village and rural municipality in Salta Province, Argentina
 La Candelaria Department, Salta Province, Argentina
 La Candelaria, Bogotá, Colombia
 La Candelaria Parish, Caracas, Venezuela

See also

 Candelaria (disambiguation)